Thornton Redbacks FC is a semi-professional football club based in Thornton in the Hunter Region, New South Wales. Thornton Redbacks FC currently competes in the Northern NSW Football Northern League One with senior teams in First Grade, Reserve Grade and U18's and whilst junior teams range from U13 to U16.

The Northern NSW Football Northern League One is the second tier of football sitting under the NNSWF National Premier Leagues.

References 
 Northern NSW Football – 
 Thornton Redbacks FC – 

1978 establishments in Australia
Association football clubs established in 1978
Soccer clubs in Newcastle, New South Wales